De Nuevos A Viejos (English: From New to Old) is the second studio album by Wisin & Yandel. It peaked at number 12 on the Billboard Latin Pop Albums chart and number 26 on the Billboard Top Latin Albums chart. This album was nominated for a Latin Billboard Music Award.

Track listing

Charts

References

Wisin & Yandel albums
2001 albums